Sidney R. Rice (born September 1, 1986) is an American former professional football player who was a  wide receiver for seven seasons in the National Football League (NFL). Rice played college football for the South Carolina Gamecocks. He was drafted by the Minnesota Vikings in the second round of the 2007 NFL Draft.

He also played for the Seattle Seahawks, with whom he became a champion in Super Bowl XLVIII over the Denver Broncos.

Personal life
Rice was born to Ida Coleman in Pickens, South Carolina.  Rice has two older brothers, Jarvis Rice and Tremell Austin. Rice grew up in Gaffney, where he played both football and basketball for the Gaffney High School Indians. Rice, who graduated from Gaffney High School in 2004 was named All-State in both sports, leading the basketball team to consecutive state titles and the football team to a state championship as well. He had 38 catches for 735 yards and 11 touchdowns his junior campaign. He was named to the High School Sports Report Statewide All-State team and selected Offensive Player of the Year. In 2003, Rice caught 77 passes for 1,414 yards and 14 touchdowns as a senior. Rice ended his high school career with 167 receptions for 3,044 yards and 31 touchdowns. In addition, Rice excelled in basketball, earning 2002 - 2003 Class 4A Basketball Player of the Year after helping Gaffney to the state championship. That season, he averaged 18 points and seven rebounds per game, as the Indians finished the basketball season with an undefeated 28-0 record.

College career
Rice was heavily recruited by many colleges but signed with the University of South Carolina, where he played for the South Carolina Gamecocks football team from 2004 to 2006.

Rice was redshirted in his freshman year in 2004.

In his redshirt freshman year in 2005, Rice had 70 catches for 1,143 yards (14th all time in SEC history) and 13 touchdowns, a single season receiving record at University of South Carolina (eighth all time in Southeastern Conference history). He began his career with eight consecutive games with a touchdown. This streak ended with the 30-22 upset of the nationally ranked Florida Gators at Williams-Brice Stadium.

In 2006, Rice caught 72 passes for 1,090 yards and 10 touchdowns. He had five touchdowns against Florida Atlantic which broke a South Carolina record and tied an SEC record for most receiving touchdowns in a game. For his short career, he broke Sterling Sharpe's school career touchdown record in just two years with the program, finishing his career with 23 touchdowns.

Professional career

Pre-draft

Minnesota Vikings
Rice was drafted in the second round with the 44th overall pick of the 2007 NFL Draft by the Minnesota Vikings. He signed a four-year contract with the Vikings in 2007.

Rice caught his first touchdown pass on September 30, 2007 playing against the Green Bay Packers. In Week 15, against the Bears, Rice injured his knee, causing him to miss the final two games.

Rice finished his rookie season with 31 receptions for 396 yards and four touchdowns (second most receiving touchdowns by a 2007 rookie). He also completed two passes including a 79-yard pass, the longest for a non-quarterback in Vikings history.

The next season, Rice was named a starter with the Vikings new wide receiver acquisition Bernard Berrian. He got off to a pretty good start scoring a 23-yard touchdown in week one against the Packers. However, Rice suffered a knee injury that kept him out until week 9. When he returned, most of his playing time was when the Vikings were in the red zone as he would lose his starting job to Bobby Wade. Rice finished the 2008 season with 15 catches for 141 yards and 4 touchdowns (third most receiving touchdowns by a 2008 second year player).

2009 Pro Bowl season

In 2009, Rice had the most successful and stellar season of his career. Rice won his starting job back, and showed chemistry with new quarterback Brett Favre. In a game against the Baltimore Ravens, he finished with six catches for 176 yards. The next week in Pittsburgh, Rice had a career-high 10 catches for 136 yards. In Week 10 against the Detroit Lions, Rice broke his 176-yard mark, with a seven-catch, 201-yard performance against the Lions. On November 18, 2009, Rice was named the NFC Offensive Player of the Week, the first time he received that award. Also, during the same year, he was selected to his first Pro Bowl.
 In Week 17 of the 2009 NFL season, Rice caught 6 receptions for 112 yards, along with two touchdowns. This helped to complete a 44-7 rout of the New York Giants and help the Vikings to a 12-4 regular season record. This was enough for them to secure the #2 seed in the NFC playoffs.

Coming off a bye week in the first round of the playoffs, Rice and the Vikings played host to the NFC East champions Dallas Cowboys in the NFC Divisional Playoffs at the Metrodome. Rice played exceptionally well against the Cowboys, catching six passes from Brett Favre for 141 yards and 3 touchdowns, with a long of 47 yards.

Hip surgery and 2010 season
Rice suffered a hip injury in the 2009-10 season's NFC Championship game against the Saints.  He was supposed to have surgery in the off-season during the spring to repair it. He did not go through with it during the off-season, fearing its effect on his performance. On Monday August 23, 2010, three weeks into the next season's training camp, he decided to go through with the surgery and was unable to play with the Vikings until November. Rice underwent a "pick" procedure similar to microfracture knee surgery to repair joint cartilage damage. Doctors poked holes in the hip bone, making it bleed to generate cells that would reconstitute themselves as replacement fibrocartilage to fill the damaged gap.  To compensate, the Vikings signed free agent wide receiver Javon Walker, whom Brett Favre played with in Green Bay, as well as trade for wide receiver Greg Camarillo, formerly of the Miami Dolphins. The Vikings also traded for wide receiver Randy Moss from New England, whom they released after four games. Sidney Rice was activated from the physically unable to perform (PUP) list and made his 2010 season debut on November 21 against the Green Bay Packers in the Metrodome with 3 catches for 56 yards. In a game against the Chicago Bears on Dec. 2010, Rice caught Favre's 6,300th completion, the final one of his career. Rice went on to have a major role in the Vikings' late-season victories over the Buffalo Bills and Philadelphia Eagles before sustaining a concussion during the Eagles game. This left him unable to play in the season finale, a loss against the Detroit Lions. The Vikings did not re-sign Rice for the 2011 season, having used their franchise tag on linebacker Chad Greenway.

Seattle Seahawks
After the lifting of the NFL lockout, Rice agreed to terms on a five-year, $41 million contract with the Seattle Seahawks. The contract guaranteed Rice $18 million over its duration. He was reunited in Seattle with offensive coordinator Darrell Bevell and quarterback Tarvaris Jackson, a member of the Vikings during Rice's tenure there.

Rice was placed on injured reserve on November 30, 2011.

On October 14, 2012, Rice caught the game-winning touchdown from a 46-yard pass from rookie quarterback Russell Wilson to beat the New England Patriots by a score of 24–23.

On December 2, 2012, Rice caught the game-winning touchdown from Russell Wilson in overtime, as the Seahawks edged past the Chicago Bears 23–17 at Soldier Field; he caught six passes for 99 yards and the one touchdown, keeping the Seahawks in contention for a wild-card berth with a 7-5 record.
 
With the trade and signing of wide receiver Percy Harvin and cornerback Antoine Winfield, Rice was again reunited with two of his Minnesota teammates.

On October 28, 2013, in a game against the St. Louis Rams, Rice tore his ACL, rendering him out for the remainder of the season. Without Rice, the Seahawks would win Super Bowl XLVIII after defeating the Denver Broncos by a score of 43–8.

On February 28, 2014, the Seahawks released Rice. He agreed to re-sign with Seahawks on a one-year contract on April 16, 2014.

On July 23, 2014, Rice announced his retirement from professional football due to multiple concussions throughout his career.

NFL career statistics

Regular season

References

External links

South Carolina Gamecocks bio
ESPN stats

1986 births
Living people
American football wide receivers
South Carolina Gamecocks football players
Minnesota Vikings players
National Conference Pro Bowl players
People from Gaffney, South Carolina
People from Pickens, South Carolina
Players of American football from South Carolina
Seattle Seahawks players